Siege of Cherbourg may refer to:

Siege of Cherbourg (1139), the siege and capture of the town by forces loyal to Stephen, King of England
Siege of Cherbourg (1142), the siege and capture of the town by Geoffrey Plantagenet, Count of Anjou
Siege of Cehrbourg (1378), the unsuccessful siege of the town by the French during the Hundred Years' War
Siege of Cherbourg (1418), the siege and capture of the town by the English during the Hundred Years' War
Siege of Cherbourg (1450), the siege and capture of the town by the French during the Hundred Years' War